Pavel Řehák (born 7 October 1963) is a former Czech football player.

He played in the top flight for Slavia Prague and Drnovice in his native country, as well as in Japan.

Following his playing career, Řehák became a manager. He was assistant manager for Vissel Kobe before taking on the manager role in June 2005.

Club statistics

Managerial statistics

References

External links
 
 

1963 births
Living people
Czech footballers
Czech expatriate footballers
Czech First League players
SK Slavia Prague players
FK Drnovice players
Japan Soccer League players
J1 League players
Japan Football League (1992–1998) players
Japan Football League players
JEF United Chiba players
Hokkaido Consadole Sapporo players
Yokohama FC players
Expatriate footballers in Japan
Czech football managers
J1 League managers
Vissel Kobe managers
Expatriate football managers in Japan
Association football forwards
SK Slavia Prague non-playing staff
Association football coaches